The 2010 Croatian Figure Skating Championships ( took place between 19 and 20 December 2009 at the Zagrebacki Velesajam in Zagreb. Skaters competed in the disciplines of men's singles, ladies' singles, and synchronized skating across the levels of senior, junior, novice.

Senior results

Men

Ladies

Synchronized skating

Junior results

Men

Ladies

Synchronized skating

Novice results

Boys

Girls

External links
 2010 Championships
 Croatian Skating Federation 

Croatian Figure Skating Championships
Croatian Figure Skating Championships, 2010
2009 in figure skating